Toowoomba South is an electoral district of the Legislative Assembly in the Australian state of Queensland. It was created with the 1972 redistribution, and replaced the abolished Toowoomba East.

The electorate covers the eastern and inner southern suburbs of Toowoomba. It excludes the outer southern suburbs of Toowoomba, Drayton, Darling Heights and the other areas near the University of Southern Queensland, which fall in Condamine.

It is part of the Darling Downs group of seats, and is bounded on the east by Lockyer, the north by Toowoomba North, and on the south and west by Condamine.

The electorate was held by John McVeigh for the Liberal National Party, until his resignation on 29 April 2016 to contest the federal seat of Groom at the 2016 federal election. David Janetzki was elected at the subsequent by-election on 16 July 2016.

Members for Toowoomba South

Election results

References

External links
 

Darling Downs
Toowoomba South
Toowoomba